Patrão is an album by bassist Ron Carter which was recorded at Van Gelder Studio in 1980 and released on the Milestone label the following year.

Track listing
All compositions by Ron Carter.
 "Ah Rio" – 8:13
 "Nearly" – 9:43
 "Tail Feathers" – 7:06
 "Yours Truly" – 5:16
 "Third Plane" – 7:07

Personnel
Ron Carter – bass
Chet Baker – trumpet, flugelhorn
Aloisio Aguiar (tracks 1 & 5), Kenny Barron – piano
 Amaury Tristão – guitar (tracks 1 & 5)
Jack DeJohnette (tracks 2-4), Edison Machado (tracks 1 & 5) – drums
Naná Vasconcelos – percussion (tracks 1 & 5)

References

Milestone Records albums
Ron Carter albums
1981 albums
Albums recorded at Van Gelder Studio